Electric Rodeo is the seventh studio album released by Australian country musician Lee Kernaghan. The album was released in July 2002 and peaked at number five on the ARIA Charts. The album was certified platinum in 2003.

At the ARIA Music Awards of 2002, the album was nominated for the ARIA Award for Best Country Album.

At the 2003 Country Music Awards of Australia, the album won Album of the Year and Top Selling Album of the Year.

Track listing
 "The Way It Is"
 "Electric Rodeo"
 "Something in the Water"
 "An Ordinary Bloke"
 "Baptise the Ute"
 "Long Night"
 "You Rock My World"
 "A Handful of Dust"
 "That Old Caravan"
 "Wild Side of Life"
 "Sing You Back Home"
 "Texas QLD 4385"
 "The Odyssey"

Charts

Weekly charts

Year-end charts

Certifications

References

2002 albums
Lee Kernaghan albums